United Nations Security Council Resolution 2071 was unanimously adopted on 12 October 2012. It related to the 2012 Northern Mali conflict and mandated that an actionable plan for military intervention be made by ECOWAS and the African Union within 45 days.

See also
2012 Northern Mali conflict#Proposed foreign intervention
List of United Nations Security Council Resolutions 2001 to 2100

References

External links
Text of the Resolution at undocs.org

2012 United Nations Security Council resolutions
United Nations Security Council resolutions concerning Mali
2012 in Mali
Mali War
October 2012 events